Shah Nawaz Khan may refer to:

 Samsam ud Daula Shah Nawaz Khan (1700-1758), Indian courtier and historian
 Shah Nawaz Khan (Chief Justice), Pakistani judge
 Shah Nawaz Khan (general) (1914-1983), Indian army officer and politician
 Shah Nawaz Khan (Ghazni politician), Afghan representative from Ghazni to the Meshrano Jirga
 Shah Nawaz Khan, Punjab, a town in Okara District, Pakistan